Live at the Top is a live album by jazz pianist Junior Mance which was released on the Atlantic label in 1969.

Reception

Allmusic awarded the album 3 stars with the review by Dave Nathan stating, "This is another satisfying session by Mance, who never received the attention and credit he merited for his playing".

Track listing
 "Before This Time Another Year" (Traditional) - 9:32
 "I Wish I Knew (How It Would Feel to Be Free)" (Billy Taylor, Dick Dalas) - 9:38
 "That's All" (Alan Brandt, Bob Haymes) - 9:13
 "Turning Point" (David Newman) - 7:50

Personnel
Junior Mance - piano 
David Newman - flute (track 4), tenor saxophone (track 3)
Wilbur Little - bass
Rudy Collins (tracks 2-4), Paul Gusman (track 1) - drums

References

 
1969 live albums
Junior Mance live albums
Atlantic Records live albums
Albums produced by Joel Dorn
Albums recorded at the Village Gate